A Devil's Chaplain: Reflections on Hope, Lies, Science, and Love  is a 2003 book of selected essays and other writings by Richard Dawkins. Published five years after Dawkins's previous book Unweaving the Rainbow, it contains essays covering subjects including pseudoscience, genetic determinism, memetics, terrorism, religion and creationism. A section of the book is devoted to Dawkins' late adversary Stephen Jay Gould.

The book's title is a reference to a quotation of Charles Darwin, in a letter to J.D. Hooker dated 13 July 1856, made in reference to Darwin's lack of belief in how "a perfect world" was designed by God (and a reference to Reverend Robert Taylor):
"What a book a devil's chaplain might write on the clumsy, wasteful, blundering low and horridly cruel works of nature!"

Reception
Robin McKie reviewed the book for The Observer and stated that the book contained a mixture of touching essays and "the good, old knockabout stuff at which Dawkins excels".

See also
Argument from poor design
Great Ape Project

References

External links

 Review by Michael Ruse, 2003. "Through a Glass, Darkly." American Scientist.
 Review by Richard Harries, 2003. "A Devil's Chaplain by Richard Dawkins". The Independent.
 Review by Richard Holloway, 2003. "A callous world." The Guardian.

2003 non-fiction books
Books by Richard Dawkins
Books critical of religion
Essays about biology
English-language books
English essay collections
Houghton Mifflin books